Ihsanullah Khan (born 11 October 2003) is a Pakistani cricketer who plays as a right-arm fast bowler.

Early life
Ihsanullah was born in the Arkot village, situated in the Swat Valley's Matta Tehsil, losing his home during the 2022 floods, while he began his professional cricket career in 2017, playing for FATA Under-16, in 2018 taking part in PCB's U-16 Pentangular T20 Tournament.

Domestic career
In January 2022, Ihsanullah made his Twenty20 debut, after being named as one of the local players for Multan Sultans in the draft for the 2022 PSL. 

In September 2022, he made his first-class debut for Khyber Paktunkhwa, becoming the team's highest wicket-tacker for the Quaid-e-Azam Trophy in the 2022-23 season while also being the second highest wicket-taker in the Pakistan ODI Cup for 2022-23.

In February 2023, he was noticed for delivering the second best spell of the Pakistan Super League with a figures of 5-12 against Quetta Gladiators, while playing for Multan Sultans for the 2023 PSL. His spell is also considered the fastest in PSL's history, with an average speed of 144.37 kph and a delivery going over 150 kph, surpassing Haris Rauf's spell against Peshawar Zalmi during the 2022 PSL, when his average speed was 144.16 kph. 

In March 2023, at the end of the 2023 PSL, he won both the HBL PSL 8 Player of the Tournament award as well the Bowler of HBL PSL 8 award, for his 22 wickets at an economy-rate of 7.59.

International career
In December 2022, alongside batsmen Saim Ayub and Haseebullah Khan, Ihsanullah was one of the three youngsters selected to be included in the national squad for the second Test match of the New Zealand series in Karachi, so they could get some international exposure and see the dynamics of the dressing room.

In March 2023, he was named in Pakistan's Twenty20 International (T20I) squad for the series against Afghanistan.

References

External links 
 

2002 births
Living people
Pakistani cricketers
Multan Sultans cricketers
People from Swat District